Fleet Logistics Support Squadron 51 (VR-51), nicknamed the Windjammers, is a United States Navy Reserve transport squadron of the United States Navy's Fleet Logistics Support Wing, stationed at Marine Corps Air Station Kaneohe Bay, Hawaii. It is a reserve unit composed of both active duty and Selected Reserve sailors. The squadron maintains two Boeing 737-700C aircraft, designated as the C-40A Clipper, having received their first C-40 in May 2019, with the second one arriving in July. Previously, the squadron operated the Gulfstream C-20G.

See also
 History of the United States Navy
 List of United States Navy aircraft squadrons

References

Fleet logistics support squadrons of the United States Navy